James Woodhouse was an American surgeon and chemist.

James Woodhouse may also refer to:

James Woodhouse (poet), English writer
James Woodhouse, 1st Baron Terrington
Jim Woodhouse, cricketer